Leslie Walter Minter (born 1890) was an English-born footballer who played as a centre-half. Although born and raised in England, he is best known for his footballing career in Italy.

During his time in Italy, he played for U.S. Internazionale Napoli, FBC Internaples and he was among the founding players of  S.S.C. Napoli.

Having spent over a decade in Naples, he was given Italian citizenship and later represented a south-central Italian team versus a southeast French selection in Rome.

References

1890 births
Association football central defenders
S.S.C. Napoli players
English footballers
Italian footballers
Year of death missing
English expatriate footballers
English expatriate sportspeople in Italy
Expatriate footballers in Italy